H. floribunda may refer to:

 Habenaria floribunda, a bog orchid
 Hackelia floribunda, a borage native to western North America
 Hasseltia floribunda, a neotropical plant
 Haworthia floribunda, a succulent plant
 Hemizonia floribunda, a tarweed native to North America
 Holarrhena floribunda, a plant used in traditional African medicine
 Hortonia floribunda, a plant endemic to Sri Lanka